This is a list of television programs formerly or currently broadcast by the Discovery Channel, in the United States.

Current programming 
The following programs are currently airing on Discovery Channel:

 A Cut Above
 Alaska: The Last Frontier
 Alaskan Bush People
 BattleBots
 Bee Czar
 Bering Sea Gold
 Billy Buys Brooklyn
 Brink of Disaster
 Deadliest Catch
 Deadliest Catch: Bloodline
 Deadliest Catch: The Viking Returns
 Diesel Brothers
 Dirty Jobs
 Expedition Unknown
 Expedition X
 Gold, Lies & Videotape
 Gold Rush
 Gold Rush: Dave Turin's Lost Mine
 Gold Rush: Freddy Dodge's Mine Rescue
 Gold Rush: Parker's Trail
 Gold Rush: White Water
 Growing Belushi
 Hoffman Family Gold
 Ice Cold Catch 
 Josh Gates Tonight
 Lone Star Law
 Louisiana Law
 Moonshiners
 Moonshiners: American Spirit
 Moonshiners: Master Distiller
 Mysteries of the Abandoned
 Mysteries of the Abandoned: Hidden America
 Mysteries of the Deep
 Mystery at Blind Frog Ranch
 Naked and Afraid
 Naked and Afraid XL
 Outback Opal Hunters
 Sewer Divers 
 Street Outlaws
 Street Outlaws: America's List
 Street Outlaws: End Game
 Street Outlaws: Farmtruck and AZN
 Street Outlaws: Fastest in America
 Street Outlaws: No Prep Kings
 Street Outlaws: No Prep Kings: The Great 8
 Tales from the Explorers Club

Former programming 

 100 Days Wild (2020)
 2057 (2007)
 9/11 Firehouse (2013)
 A Fishing Story with Ronnie Green (2017)
 Aaron Needs a Job (2019)
 Adrenaline Rush Hour (2009)
 After the Climb (2007)
 Africa (2013)
 Air Pressure (2015)
 Airplane Repo (2010–15)
 Airshow (2015)
 Alaskan Steel Men (2013)
 Alien Planet (2005 special)
 All on the Line (2020)
 American Casino (2004–05)
 American Chopper (2003–06, 2010–12, 2018–20)
 American Guns (2011–12)
 American Hot Rod (2004–08)
 American Loggers (2009–11)
 American Made Inventors (2017)
 American Muscle (2014)
 American Tarzan (2016)
 American Treasures (2011)
 American Underworld (2011)
 Amish Mafia (2012–15)
 Animal Face-Off (2004)
 Apocalipse Preppers (2013)
 Arctic Rescue (2015)
 Argo: Inside Story (2013)
 Arthur C. Clarke's Mysterious Universe (1994–95)
 Assignment Discovery
 Atlas (2006–08)
 Atlas 4D (2010)
 Auction Kings (2010–13)
 Backyard Oil (2013)
 Bad Chad Customs (2019–20)
 Bad Universe
 Barbarians – Secrets of the Dark Ages (2002)
 The Battle for Rome (2006)
 Battlefield Detectives (2003)
 Beast Tracker
 Beachbody
 Before the Dinosaurs (2005)
 Before We Ruled the Earth (2003)
 Bermuda Triangle Exposed
 Beyond 2000
 Beyond Tomorrow
 Big! (2004)
 The Big Brain Theory (2013)
 Biker Build-Off (2002–07)
 Billion Dollar Secret
 Bizarre Dinosaurs
 Blood and Oil (2013)
 Blue Collar Bankers
 The Blue Planet (2001)
 Blueprint for Disaster (2004–08)
 Bone Detectives (2007–08)
 Brainiac
 Breakout
 Brew Masters (2010)
 Building the Future
 Building the Ultimate (2005)
 Built for Champions
 Bush Tucker Man (c. 1992)
 Cal Fire (2021)
 Canada's Worst Driver (2005–18)
 Canada's Worst Handyman (2006–11)
 Carfellas
 Cash Cab (2005–12, 2017–18)
 Chop Shop London
 Choppers
 The Colony (2009–2010)
 Connect
 Contact (2019)
 Crash of the Century
 Curiosity (2011–13)
 Curious and Unusual Deaths
 Curse of Akakor (2021)
 The Curse Of Tutankhamen (1999)
 Daily Planet (1995–2018)
 Dangerman (Geoff Mackley)
 Darcy's Wild Life
 Daring Capers (1999–2001)
 Dark Fellowships: The Vril
 Dead Men's Tales
 Deadliest Catch: Dungeon Cove (2016)
 Deadly Women
 Dealers (2012)
 Deception with Keith Barry
 Decoding Disaster
 Designer Guys
 Destroyed in Seconds (2008–09)
 The Detonators
 The Devil's Ride
 Diagnosis: Unknown
 Diesel Brothers: Diesel Nation (2020)
 Dino Hunters (2020–21)
 Dinosaur Planet (2003)
 Dinosaur Revolution (2011)
 Dirty Mudder Truckers (2019–21)
 Disaster Detective
 Disaster Eyewitness (2011)
 Discovery Atlas (2006–08)
 Discover Magazine (1992–2000)
 Discovery News
 Discovery Profile
 Discovery Sport
 Discovery Sunday
 Doctorology (2007)
 Dodgeball Thunderdome (2020)
 Doing DaVinci (2009–10)
 Doomsday 2012 (2008 special)
 Doomsday Bunkers
 Double Agents
 Download: The True Story of the Internet (2008)
 Dragons: A Fantasy Made Real
 Driven (2020)
 Dual Survival (2010–16)
 Dude, You%27re Screwed (2013–14)
 Daily Planet (TV series)
 Easy Does It (1991–96)
 Eco-Challenge (2001)
 Eco-Tech (2003)
 End Day
 Endurance
 Engineering Volcanoes
 Equinox
 Escape Stories (2001)
 Everest: Beyond the Limit (2006–09)
 Everything You Need To Know
 Exhibit A: Secrets of Forensic Science
 Expedition Borneo
 Expedition to the Edge (2020)
 Explosions Gone Wrong
 Extreme Engineering (2003–11)
 Extreme Machines (1997)
 Edge of Alaska (2014–17)
 Extreme Peril
 Extreme Smuggling (2013)
 Extreme Survival
 Fast N' Loud (2012–20)
 The FBI Files (1998–2006)
 Fearless Planet (2007)
 The Feuding Tombs of Christopher Columbus
 Fields of Armor
 Fight or Die
 Fight Quest (2007–08)
 The Final 24
 Finding Escobar's Millions (2017–19)
 Fireballs from Space
 Firehouse USA: Boston (2005)
 Firepower
 Flying Heavy Metal (2005)
 Flying Wild Alaska (2011–12)
 Forensic Detectives (1999–2001)
 Frontiers of Construction
 Frontiers of Flight
 Frozen Planet
 Full Force Nature
 Full Metal Challenge
 The Future Is Wild
 Future Weapons (2006–08)
 FutureCar
 Game of Stones
 Garage Takeover
 Getaway Driver (2021)
 Ghost Lab (2009–11)
 Ghosthunters (1996–97)
 Giant Squid: Caught On Camera
 Globe Trekker
 Going Tribal
 Gold Rush: Winter's Fortune (2021)
 Gold Rush The Dirt: The Hoffman Story (2021)
 Gold Star Racing
 Great Bear Stakeout (special; premiered May 12, 2013)
 The Great Biker Build Off
 The Greatest Ever (2005)
 Green Village
 Guardians of the Glades (2019–20)
 Guinea Pig
 Gutbusters (2002)
 Hard To Kill (2018)
 Harley and the Davidsons (2016)
 A Haunting (2005–07)
 The Haunting in Connecticut (2003)
 Hazard Pay
 Heirs to the Dare (2014)
 Heroes (2006)
 Hidden
 Hijack El Al Flight 426
 Hogs Gone Wild
 The Holocaust: In Memory of Millions
 Home Matters
 Homestead Rescue (2016–21)
 Homestead Rescue: Raney Ranch (2020–21)
 Hooked on Fishing (1999–unknown)
 How Beer Saved the World (2011)
 How Booze Built America (2012)
 How Do They Do It?
 How Does It Work?
 How It's Made
 How to Survive
 How The Universe Works (2010)
 How We Invented the World (miniseries; 2013)
 Howe & Howe Tech (2010–11)
 Huge Moves
 Human Body: Pushing the Limits (2008)
 Hunting Atlantis (2021)
 I, VIDEOGAME
 I Quit (2020)
 I Shouldn't Be Alive (2005–06)
 I Was Bitten
 Iditarod: Toughest Race on Earth (2008)
 The Impossible Row (2020)
 In the Wild with Harry Butler
 Incredible India!
 India with Sanjeev Bhaskar
 Industrial Revelations (2002–04)
 Inside Planet Earth
 Instinto Asesino
 Interior Motives
 Into Alaska with Jeff Corwin
 Into the Lion's Den
 Into the Universe with Stephen Hawking (2010)
 Into the Unknown with Josh Bernstein (2008)
 Invention
 Is Born
 Is It Possible? (2010)
 It Takes a Thief (2005–07)
 Jeremy Wade's Dark Waters (2019)
 JFK: The End Of Camelot
 Jungle Gold (2012–13)
 Junkyard Wars (2001–03)
 Justice Files
 Killing Fields (2016–18)
 Klondike (2014)
 The Know Zone (1995)
 Korea: The Forgotten War
 LA Ink (2007–11)
 The Last Alaskans (2016–19)
 Last Day of the Dinosaurs (2010 special)
 The Last Huntsmen (2013)
 Last One Standing
 Legend Detectives (2005)
 Legends of the Wild (2020)
 Licence to Drill
 Life (2010)
 Lobster Wars (2007)
 Lost Animals of the 20th Century
 Lost Relics of the Knights Templar (2020–21)
 The Lost Ship of Venice (2006)
 The Lost Tomb of Jesus (2007)
 Lunar Jim (2006–11)
 Lynette Jennings Design
 Magic of Science
 Mammals Vs. Dinosaurs
 Mammal Revolution (TBA)
 Man vs. Bear (2019–20)
 Man vs. Wild  (2006–11)
 Man, Woman, Wild (2010–12)
 Manhunt: Unabomber (2017 miniseries)
 Massive Engines
 Massive Machines 
 Master of Arms (2018)
 Masters of Disaster (2019)
 Mayday
 Mega Builders (2005–10)
 Mega Engineering
 Miami Ink
 Mind, Body & Kick Ass Moves
 Miracle Planet
 Misfit Garage (2014–18)
 Modern Gladiators
 Moment of Impact
 Mongrel Nation (2003)
 Monkey Business
 Monster Garage (2002–06)
 Monster House (2003–06)
 Monster: A Portrait Of Stalin In Blood
 Monsters Inside Me
 Monsters Resurrected (2009)
 Moonshiners: Whiskey Business (2019)
 Most Evil (2006–08)
 Mostly True Stories: Urban Legends Revealed
 Mummy Detective with Bob Brier (2004)
 My Shocking Story
 The Mysterious Death of Cleopatra (2006)
 MythBusters (2003–16)
 Naked Castaway (2013)
 Nasty by Nature'''
 Nature by Design Nature's Deadliest Nature's Most Amazing Events The New Al-Qaeda The New Detectives: Case Studies in Forensic Science (1996–2005)
 The Next Step (1991–96)
 NextWorld Nightmare Next Door Normandy: The Great Crusade North America (2013 miniseries)
 Oddities On the Run One Car Too Far (2012)
 One Man Army (2011)
 One Step Beyond One Way Out (2008–09)
 Out In The Cold Outback Lockdown (2020)
 Outlaw Empires (2012 miniseries)
 Overhaulin' (2004–09 on TLC, 2012–15 on Discovery)
 Pagans Passport to Space Patent Bending (2006)
 The Patiala Necklace (2004)
 People Watch Perfect Disaster (2006)
 Pitchmen (2009–11)
 Planes That Never Flew Planet Earth Point of No Return  (2002)
 Pompeii – Killer In Our Midst (2005)
 Pompeii: The Last Day (2003)
 Pompeii of the East (2005 special)
 Pop Nation Portraits Profiles of Nature Property Wars (2012–13)
 The Prosecutors: In Pursuit of Justice Prototype This! (2008–09)
 Prehistoric Prehistoric Planet Prehistoric Park Pyramid Beyond Imagination (2002)
 Ragin' Cajuns (2012)
 Raging Planet Raising Wild (2019)
 Rally Round the House Raw Nature Ray Mears' The Real Heroes of Telemark (2003 special)
 Ray Mears' World of Survival (1997–98)
 The Reagan Legacy The Real American Cowboy Really Big Things Reclaimed (2020)
 Redwood Kings Reporters At War (2003)
 Rex Hunt's Fishing Adventure (1991–2004)
 Rides Rise of the Video Game (2007)
 Rivals River of No Return (2019)
 Road Trip USA Rob Riggle: Global Investigator (2020)
 Robotica Rocket Around the Xmas Tree (2020)
 Rocket Science Royal Deaths & Diseases (2003–04)
 RTL Autowereld Sacred Steel Bikes Saint Hoods (2013)
 Salvage Squad Sasquatch: Legend Meets Science Savage Builds (2019)
 Sci-Fi Saved My Life Sci-Trek The Science of Sex Appeal The Science of Star Wars Scrapheap Challenge Serengeti (2019–21)
 Seven Wonders of... Sex Sense (miniseries)
 Shark Week 
 Siberian Cut (2014)
 Silver Rush (2013)
 The Sinking of the Lusitania: Terror at Sea Skywire Live Smash Lab (2007–08)
 Solving History with Olly Steeds (2010)
 Some Assembly Required (2007–08)
 Sons of Guns Stealth Secrets (2005)
 Sticker Shock (2018)
 Storm Chasers (2007–11)
 Storm Warning Story of India Stranded: With Cash Peters (Travel Channel)
 Strange Days at Blake Holsey High (2009)
 Street Outlaws: Mega Cash Days (2021)
 Street Outlaws: Memphis (2018–21)
 Street Outlaws: New Orleans (2016–17)
 Street Outlaws: No Prep Kings: Team Attack (2021)
 Street Outlaws: Race Night in America (2020)
 Stunt Junkies The Sun Super Structures of the World (1998–)
 Super Weapons of the Ancient World (2005)
 Superstorm Supervolcano Surprise by Design Survive This Survivorman Swamp Brothers (2011–12)
 Swamp Loggers (2009–12)
 Swords: Life on the Line (2009–12)
 Tanks Tanks! The Aces (2005)
 Test Case (2006)
 Texas Car Wars (2012)
 Tilt 23 1/2 Time Warp (2008–09)
 Titanic: Anatomy of a Disaster Top Gear Top Marques Top Ten (2004–05)
 Tournament Tracking Africa's Dinosaurs (2002)
 Travelers Treasure! Treasure Quest: Snake Island (2015–18)
 True Horror with Anthony Head (2004)
 Twin Turbos (2018–20)
 Ultimate Car Build-Off Ultimate Cars The Ultimate Guide The Ultimate Ten Unchained Reaction (2012)
 Under Siege: America's Northern Border (2013)
 Undercover Billionaire (2019–21)
 Understanding Universe Unsolved History (2002–05)
 Untamed Africa Valley of the T-Rex (2001)
 Vegas Rat Rods (2014–18)
 Verminators (2008–09)
 Viking Voyages: Wings of the Dragon (2005)
 Walking with Beasts Walking with Cavemen Walking with Dinosaurs A Walking With Dinosaurs Trilogy: Sea Monsters (2003)
 Walking with Monsters Warlocks Rising (premiered July 5, 2013)
 Warrior Women Weapon Masters (2007)
 Weaponizers Weapons of War (series)
 Weed Country (2013)
 Weird or What? What's That About? Wheeler Dealers (2011–15)
 When Dinosaurs Roamed America (2001)
 When Dinosaurs Ruled When We Left Earth: The NASA Missions (2008)
 Why Didn't I Think of That? Why We Hate (2019)
 Wild Discovery (1995–2002)
 Wild Pacific Wild Weather (2002 miniseries)
 Wildlife Chronicles Wings Wolves at Our Door (1997)
 A World Away World Birth Day (2002–03) World Class Cuisine World of Wonder World's Biggest And Baddest Bugs (2004)
 The World's Strangest UFO Stories World's Toughest Fixes World's Top 5 (2012)
 The World's Toughest Tunnel (2005)
 Wreckreation Nation (2009)
 X-Machines X-Ray Mega Airport (2015)
 You Have Been Warned You Spoof Discovery (2007)
 Yukon Men Zero Hour''

References 

Discovery Channel